is a station located in Higashiyodogawa-ku, Osaka, Japan.

Lines
Hankyu Senri Line

Future plans 
Construction is underway for grade separation. Work is being done as of 2019 to elevate a  section of the Kyoto Line between this station and Kami-Shinjō Station. Originally planned to be opened by 2020, various delays have resulted in the opening being pushed to 2031.

Adjacent stations

|-
!colspan=5|Hankyu Railway

References

External links
 Shimo-Shinjō Station from Hankyu Railway website

Higashiyodogawa-ku, Osaka
Railway stations in Osaka

Railway stations in Japan opened in 1921